The Cape Breton International Drum Festival, also known as the Cape Breton Drum Fest, is an annual event held in Cape Breton, Nova Scotia. The first festival was in 2001, and there have been festivals ever since, around the beginning of May of each year.

History
This festival was organized and owned by multi award winning drummer and educator Bruce Aitken  Over the past years, famous drummers such as Todd Sucherman (Styx), Alan White (Yes), and others have performed at this event. Bruce himself has been featured in many magazines (Cover of NZ's Drum Connexions March 2005) as a great promoter of drumming in his community.
The festival ran from 2001 to 2010 inclusive.

2001
Billy Ward
Randy Cooke
Charlie Coolie
Brian Talbot, Matthew Foulds, Ethan Ardelli, Michelle Stewart, Keith Mullens, Lucy McNeil, Aaron Parris, Shaun Parris, Darren Gallop & Howie McDonald
Bruce Aitken

2002
Walfredo Reyes Jr
Zoro
Paul Wertico
Jeff Salem
Maureen Brown
Wilson Laurencin
Dom Famularo
Sonny Hogan
Ethan Ardelli
Bruce Aitken with *Andrea Curry
Sean Parris

2003

Gustavo Meli
Joe Bergamini
Ndugu Chancler
Camille Gainer
Denny Seiwell
Ganesh Anandan
Troy Luccketta
Mitch Dorge
Adrian Passarelli
Dom Famularo
Marcel Bourgeois
The Dalton Drum Syndicate
Elliot Polsky

2004
Sergio Bellotti
Paul Wertico
Mitch Dorge
Vera Figueiredo
Mike Mangini
Gerry Granelli
Neil Garthly
Rick Van Horn
Mark Kelso (drummer)
Bob Gaudreau
Dom Famularo

2005
Billy Ward
Alessandra Belloni
Gil Sharone
Project A.D *Bruce Aitken*Keith Dawson Jr*Marcel Bourgeois*Skip Hadden
Yvette Preyer
Will Kennedy (drummer) Yellow Jackets
Tiger Bill Meligari
Marco Minnemann
Uriel Jones
Bernard Purdie
Vito Rezza
Dom Famularo

2006
Sergio Bellotti
Dale Anne Brendon
Billy Cobham
Bruce Aitken with *Hossam Ramzy*Lenny Castro and Joe Waye Jr
Skip Hadden
Bernard Purdie
Hossam Ramzy
Denny Seiwell
Todd Sucherman
Paul Wertico
Paul DeLong
Lenny Castro
Gary Husband
Dom Famularo

2007
Curt Bisquera
Richard Mangicaro
Bill Bruford
Pete Lockett
Ed Mann
Flo Mounier
Asani *Sherryl Sewepagaham *Debbie Houle *Sarah Pocklington
Denny Seiwell
Michael Shrieve
Alan White
John Favicchia
Derek Roddy
Phil Maturano
Dom Famularo

2008
Carmine Appice
Stephane Chamberland
Liberty DeVitto
David Jones
Uriel Jones
Dave Langguth
Larnell Lewis
Pamela Lynn
Ed Mann
Aldo Mazza
Billy Nuku
Tania Robin
Danny Seraphine
Michael Shrieve
Alan White
Dom Famularo

2009
 Tom Bona (Sue Foley, Colin James, Jeff Healey) Toronto, CA
 Danny Britt (Educator/Author) New York, U.S.
 Emmanuelle Caplette (Ima & Marilou, Annie Brocoli) Quebec, CA
 Mike Clark (Herbie Hancock, Tony Bennett, Wayne Shorter) New York, U.S.
 Damian Corniola (Educator/Clinician) Melbourne, Australia
 Tommy Clufetos (Rob Zombie, Alice Cooper, Ted Nugent) Los Angeles, U.S.
 Dom Famularo (World Drumming Ambassador) New York, U.S.
 Sonny Hogan (Ennis Sisters/ Educator) St Johns NFL, CA
 Mercedes Lander (Kittie) London Ont, CA
 Ronnie Leadbeater (Men of the Deeps/Educator) Sydney NS, CA
 Pete Lockett (Peter Gabriel, Robert Plant, Amy Winehouse) London, England
 Bill Ludwig III (B3) Chicago, U.S.
 New Brunswick Percussion Ensemble, Saint John NB Joe Macintyre, John Morrison
 Roxy Petrucci (Vixen, Madam X, Titania) New York, U.S.
 Virgil Donati
 Johnny Rabb
 Scott Pellegrom

Otarion Show Case 2009:
 Dillon Krszwda (Mira Road) CB
 Carlin MacVicar (Sydney) CB
 Anthony Pascon (Saint John) NB
 Keefer Lockwood (St Johns) Newfoundland
 Frank & Jordan Bruleigh (Sydney River) CB
 Andrew Collins (St Johns) Newfoundland
 Chuck Bucket (Halifax) NS
 Al Hovey NB
 Thomas Allen (Sydney) CB
 Evan Nemeth (Sydney) CB

Special Guest Stars 2009
 The Rhythm Queens featuring Cathy MacDougall, Joan Andrews, Val Fulford & Hannah Buhariwalla, Sydney, CB
 Bodhran Bodhran featuring Josey Lovett and friends, Sydney, CB
 Legends Award 2009 – Buddy Rich, William Ludwig 111

2010 
10th anniversary: "Year of the Legends"
 Bruce Aitken and 5 Speed Wombat
 Carmine Appice
 Scott Atkins
 Bang Crash Boom Opera
 Elie Bertrand and Harbinger
 Billy Cobham
 Liberty DeVitto
 Dom Famularo
 Skip Hadden
 Moe Hashie
 Pete Lockett
 Troy Luccketta
 Jerry Mercer
 Sean Mitchell
 Dylan Mombourquette
 Otarion Showcase
 Brad Park
 Roxy Petrucci
 Bernard Purdie
 Danny Seraphine
 Denny Seiwell
 Michael Shrieve
 Paul Wertico
 Alan White
 The Wizards of Wall Street

LIFETIME ACHIEVEMENT AWARDS 2010
Danny Seraphine
Roger McLauchlan
Paul Wertico
Steve Smith (American musician)

Master Class

Beginning with 2002, there has been a special Masters class associated with the drum fest.  The class takes place on the second day of the festival, before the festival at the Savoy Theater has started. The performer takes questions and educates the audience. 
2002 *Zoro (drummer)
2006 *Bernard Purdie
2007 *Denny Seiwell
2008 *Uriel Jones
2010 *Troy Luccketta *Jerry Mercer *Alan White (Yes drummer)

Legends Award

Also beginning with 2006, Bruce had organized an award to be presented to the drummer(s) who should deserve it. In 2006, it was presented to Bernard Purdie and Hal Blaine. Blaine did not attend due to his declining health, but he sent a message with his regards. In 2007, the award was presented to Denny Seiwell and Steve Gadd. The award to Gadd was presented to Alan White, who delivered it to Gadd. At the drum festival, by way of e-mail, Seiwell received an acknowledgment from Paul McCartney, with whom Seiwell had performed.
In 2008 Uriel Jones Michael Shrieve Dom Famularo. In 2009 William Ludwig 111 Buddy Rich
In 2010 Roxy Petrucci Jerry Mercer Carmine Appice Alan White (Yes drummer)

Music festivals established in 2001
Awards established in 2006
Music festivals in Nova Scotia
Jazz festivals in Canada
Rock festivals in Canada
Heavy metal festivals in Canada
Drum and bass events
Cape Breton Regional Municipality